John Edmunds may refer to:

 John Edmunds (English academic) (died 1544), vice-chancellor of Cambridge University
 John R. Edmunds (1812–1873), American politician, member of the Virginia House of Delegates
 John Edmunds (presenter) (born 1930s), BBC presenter and professor of drama
 John Edmunds (epidemiologist), British epidemiologist
 John C. Edmunds, professor of finance, Boston, Massachusetts
 John Edmunds Apartment House, historic house in Florida

See also
 John Edmands (disambiguation)
 John Edmonds (disambiguation)
 John Edmund (disambiguation)